Kalifa Kambi (May 1955 – 20 December 2011) was a member of the African Union's Pan-African Parliament from Gambia. He was the Deputy Minister of Agriculture.

Kambi represented Kiang West in the National Assembly from his election in 2002 to 2007.

References 

1955 births
2011 deaths
Members of the Pan-African Parliament from the Gambia
Members of the National Assembly of the Gambia
People from Kiang West